Rosetown is a locality located within the Kingston District Council in the Limestone Coast region of South Australia.

References

Limestone Coast